Yuanjun Liu (born 21 April 1982) is a Chinese professional darts player who plays in Professional Darts Corporation events.

Career
In 2016, he and Wenge Xie represented China in the 2016 PDC World Cup of Darts, and reached the second round, where they were comprehensively beaten by Phil Taylor and Adrian Lewis of England. He would play Taylor again in the 2016 Shanghai Darts Masters later in the year. He would represent China again in the 2017 PDC World Cup of Darts, this time with Weihong Li, but they were whitewashed 5–0 in the first round by the Austrian duo of Mensur Suljović and Rowby-John Rodriguez. He also played in the 2018 Shanghai Darts Masters, losing 6–2 in the first round to Gerwyn Price of Wales.

In 2018, Liu qualified for the 2019 PDC World Darts Championship through the PDC China Qualifier. In his First Round match against Brendan Dolan he won only one leg before losing 3-0.

After Qingyu Zhan withdrew from the 2019 PDC World Cup of Darts, Liu was selected to take his place and made his third appearance at the tournament.

World Championship results

PDC
2019: First round (lost to Brendan Dolan 0–3)

References

External links

1982 births
Living people
Chinese darts players
Professional Darts Corporation associate players
PDC World Cup of Darts Chinese team